Chodavaram is a part of Vijayawada in Krishna district of the Indian state of Andhra Pradesh. It is located in Penamaluru mandal of Vijayawada revenue division.

Demographics
It is located at river bank of Krishna.

References

Neighbourhoods in Vijayawada

Villages in Krishna district